This is the list of the railway stations in Piedmont owned by:
 Rete Ferroviaria Italiana (RFI), a branch of the Italian state company Ferrovie dello Stato;
 Gruppo Torinese Trasporti (GTT);
 Società Subalpina Imprese Ferroviarie (SSIF), which manages the Italian part of the Domodossola-Locarno railway line;
 Ferrovienord (FNM).

RFI stations

GTT stations

SSIF stations

FNM stations

See also

Railway stations in Italy
Ferrovie dello Stato
Rail transport in Italy
High-speed rail in Italy
Transport in Italy

References

External links

 
Piedmont